John Harold Flannery (April 19, 1898 – June 3, 1961) was an American attorney and politician who served as a member of the U.S. House of Representatives for Pennsylvania's 12th congressional district from 1937 to 1942.

Early life and education
Flannery was born in Pittston, Pennsylvania. He graduated from the Wyoming Seminary in Kingston, Pennsylvania, in 1917 and from the Penn State Dickinson Law in Carlisle, Pennsylvania, in 1920.

Career 
During World War I, Flannery served as a private in the United States Army and was honorably discharged in 1918.

He was the solicitor for Pittston City from 1926 to 1930, and served as assistant district attorney of Luzerne County, Pennsylvania, from 1932 to 1936.

Flannery was elected as a Democrat to the Seventy-fifth, Seventy-sixth, and Seventy-seventh Congresses. He served from January 3, 1937, until his resignation on January 3, 1942, to become judge of the common pleas court of Luzerne County. He was reelected in 1951 for a ten-year term and served until his death in Bethesda, Maryland.

He was a delegate to the Democratic National Conventions in 1944 and in 1960.

References
 Retrieved on 2008-02-10
The Political Graveyard

1898 births
1961 deaths
People from Pittston, Pennsylvania
Democratic Party members of the United States House of Representatives from Pennsylvania
United States Army personnel of World War I
20th-century American judges
20th-century American politicians
Judges of the Pennsylvania Courts of Common Pleas